Michael K. Obeng (born 1973) is an American plastic surgeon. He is the President of Global Health Solutions. He is also the director of MiKO Plastic Surgery and MiKO Surgery Centre.

Early life and education 
Obeng was born in Ghana in 1973.  He completed his high school at Prempeh College, a boy's educational institution in Kumasi. He served as a dining hall prefect in his final year at his school. When he was 15, he met medical professionals from Operation Smile.

He obtained his undergrad degree from Midwestern State University in Wichita Falls, Texas, after he moved to the United States. He obtained a degree in B.S. in chemistry and received his M.D. degree from the University of Texas Medical School. He received a fellowship at Harvard Medical School, specializing in hand, wrist, and micro neurovascular surgery. Obeng gave the commencement address at his alma mater Midwestern State University, in 2016.

Career 
Obeng is a Ghanaian plastic surgeon and is the Director of MiKO Plastic Surgery and MiKO Surgery Centre in Beverly Hills. He is also the President of Global Health Solutions, a healthcare consulting firm with a mission to bridge the gap between morbidity and healthy living worldwide.

Obeng came under the spotlight after provided free treatment to Tessica Brown, a woman who had applied Gorilla Glue on her hair. He managed to remove it successfully.

In 2015, Obeng and his then wife, Veronika, participated in the E! reality television series Second Wives Club.  In 2016, Obeng filed a lawsuit against E! and its parent company, NBCUniversal, seeking an injunction to bar the network from airing any episodes that include him and his children.

In 2018, Obeng made national headlines for successfully performing forehead reduction surgery. In 2019, he again made headlines for successfully performing rib removal surgery on Justin Jedlica and has served as plastic surgery consultant for a variety of print and television publications, such as the Inquisitr regarding socialite Kim Kardashian's changes in facial structure throughout her career.

Recognition 
The media recognized Obeng for his successful forehead reduction surgery in 2018.  He was also recognized for successfully performing rib removal surgery in 2019. He has served as a plastic surgery consultant for the Inquisitr regarding Kim Kardashian's changes in facial structure.

He was awarded the N.A.A.C.P. Humanitarian Award for his services with R.E.S.T.O.R.E.,. He was also included in the 2020 Ebony Power 100 List 2020. He was also rated twice among America's top plastic surgeons by the Consumer Research Council.

Philanthropy 
In 2008, Obeng started the non-profit R.E.S.T.O.R.E., which provides free reconstructive surgery and medical services to children and adults in African countries with disfiguring deformities from birth, accidents, and diseases.  R.E.S.T.O.R.E. has successfully completed over 500 surgeries since its inception.  He has donated more than $300,000 to this cause.

In 2013, Obeng won the NAACP Humanitarian Award for his work with R.E.S.T.O.R.E., alongside Vanessa Williams, Loretta Devine, and Maxine Anderson. In 2020, he was included in the 2020 Ebony Power 100 List.

Publications

Personal life 
Obeng was married to Veronica, but the marriage ended. He also participated in the E! reality television series Second Wives Club with her but he unsuccessfully tried to prohibit airing of any episodes that showed him and his children. For this he filed a lawsuit against NBC Universal.  

In 2021, Obeng appeared on the TLC reality series 90 Day Fiancé as a plastic surgeon to one of the show's co-stars, Angela Deem.

References 

1973 births
Living people
Ghanaian surgeons
American plastic surgeons
Ghanaian emigrants to the United States
Midwestern State University alumni
University of Texas Medical Branch alumni